Ficus ulmifolia is a species of plant in the family Moraceae. It is endemic to the Philippines.  It is threatened by habitat loss.

References

Sources

ulmifolia
Endemic flora of the Philippines
Trees of the Philippines
Vulnerable flora of Asia
Taxonomy articles created by Polbot